Saud Alam is an Indian politician and a Rashtriya Janata Dal member of the Bihar Legislative Assembly. He was elected in 2020 representing the Thakurganj (Vidhan Sabha constituency).

References 

Living people
Bihar MLAs 2020–2025
Rashtriya Janata Dal politicians
Year of birth missing (living people)